L. D. Livingston (February 19, 1905 – July 16, 1957), nicknamed "Larry" and "Goo Goo", was an American Negro league outfielder between 1928 and 1932.

Early life and career
A native of Fort Worth, Texas, Livingston attended I.M. Terrell High School and Wiley College. He made his Negro leagues debut in 1928 with the Kansas City Monarchs, where he played three seasons before going on to play for the New York Black Yankees and Pittsburgh Crawfords. Livingston died in Fort Worth in 1957 at age 52.

References

Further reading
 Lewis, Bert (May 19, 1928). "Wiley Downs Bishop, 6-4, at Marshall; Livingston Stars at Bat for Victors". The Chicago Defender. p. 9
 Defender staff (June 1, 1929). "Kansas City Opens Season by Beating Memphis". The Chicago Defender. p. 9
 Defender staff (June 22, 1929). "Kansas City Takes Lead in National League". The Chicago Defender. p. 8
 Defender staff (October 2, 1929). "K. C. Monarchs Down Cuban-Mexican Team". The Chicago Defender. p. 8
 Defender staff (June 28, 1930). "Giants Win Series from Kay Sees". The Chicago Defender. p. 9
 Clark, John L. (March 26, 1932). "With the Crawfords". Baltimore Afro-American . p. 15
 Tribune staff (May 5, 1932). "Livingston Quits After Argument". Philadelphia Tribune. p. 11
 United Press (December 9, 1938). "Jarvis, All-Stars Meet". The Kilgore News Herald. p. 5

External links
 and Baseball-Reference Black Baseball stats and Seamheads

1905 births
1957 deaths
Kansas City Monarchs players
New York Black Yankees players
Pittsburgh Crawfords players
Baseball outfielders
Baseball players from Fort Worth, Texas
Wiley Wildcats baseball players
20th-century African-American sportspeople